Nigel is an English masculine given name. 

Nigel may also refer to:
 3795 Nigel, an asteroid
 Nigel, a 1979 album by Nigel Olsson
 Nigel (bishop of Ely) (c. 1100–1169)
 Nigel (dog) (born 2008), a male Golden Retriever dog belonging to Monty Don, a British television gardening presenter
 Negel, Kurdistan, also known as Nigel, a village in Kurdistan Province, Iran
 Nigel, Gauteng, a South African town
 Nigel Creek, Canada